Jennylynn Sinead Domingo Ramp (born February 6, 2003), popularly known as Jenny Ramp, is a Filipino-American model and beauty pageant titleholder who was crowned Miss Philippines Earth 2022. She represented the Philippines at the Miss Earth 2022 pageant and placed at the Top 20.

Early life and education
Ramp hails from Santa Ignacia, Tarlac, Philippines. Ramp pursued a bachelor's degree in psychology at Holy Angel University in Angeles City, Pampanga.

Pageantry

Miss Philippines Earth 2022
On March 12, 2022, she represented Santa Ignacia, Tarlac on Bb. Kanlahi 2022 and she place as 3rd Runner up. On August 6, 2022, she represented Santa Ignacia, Tarlac at the Miss Philippines Earth 2022 pageant in Coron, Palawan, Philippines and was crowned the winner succeeding Naelah Alshorbaji of Parañaque.

Miss Earth 2022
She represented the Philippines in Miss Earth 2022 and placed in the Top 20.

Awards received
 Swimsuit Competition
 Best in Long Gown (Air Group)

References

External links

2003 births
Living people
Filipino female models
Filipino people of American descent
American female models
American people of Filipino descent
Miss Philippines Earth winners
Miss Earth 2022 contestants
People from Tarlac